The Kusilvak Mountains (Ingrill’er, Manialnguq in Yup'ik) is a mountain range of the Yukon Delta in Kusilvak Census Area, Alaska, to which the range gives its name. The mountains are adjacent to Nunavakanuk Lake. At their highest point they reach  and span over 5 miles across.

The mountains were called Ingieguk on Russian maps, probably from the Yup'ik language name for mountain.

References

Landforms of Kusilvak Census Area, Alaska
Mountain ranges of Alaska
Mountains of Unorganized Borough, Alaska